In enzymology, a phosphatidylglycerol-membrane-oligosaccharide glycerophosphotransferase is an enzyme that catalyzes the chemical reaction

phosphatidylglycerol + membrane-derived-oligosaccharide D-glucose  1,2-diacyl-sn-glycerol + membrane-derived-oligosaccharide 6-(glycerophospho)-D-glucose

Thus, the two substrates of this enzyme are phosphatidylglycerol and membrane-derived-oligosaccharide D-glucose, whereas its two products are 1,2-diacyl-sn-glycerol and membrane-derived-oligosaccharide 6-(glycerophospho)-D-glucose.

This enzyme belongs to the family of transferases, specifically those transferring phosphorus-containing groups transferases for other substituted phosphate groups.  The systematic name of this enzyme class is phosphatidylglycerol:membrane-derived-oligosaccharide-D-glucose glycerophosphotransferase. Other names in common use include phosphoglycerol transferase, oligosaccharide glycerophosphotransferase, and phosphoglycerol transferase I.  This enzyme participates in glycerolipid metabolism.

References

 

EC 2.7.8
Enzymes of unknown structure